The 2004 Eastern Illinois Panthers football team represented Eastern Illinois University as a member of the Ohio Valley Conference (OVC) during the 2004 NCAA Division I-AA football season. Led by 18th-year head coach Bob Spoo, the Panthers compiled an overall record of 5–6 with a mark of 4–4 in conference play, placing fourth in the OVC. Eastern Illinois played their home games at O'Brien Stadium in Charleston, Illinois.

Schedule

References

Eastern Illinois
Eastern Illinois Panthers football seasons
Eastern Illinois Panthers football